Tom Culligan (born 1945) is a Canadian entrepreneur and author.

Culligan was born in Belledune, New Brunswick. In 1975 Culligan teamed up with Frank O'Dea to found the Second Cup chain of coffee shops. He eventually bought out O'Dea and then after building it to a 150-store chain, sold the business in 1988 to Michael Bregman, the founder of MMMarvelous Muffins.

Culligan has a degree in theology and philosophy from the University of Dayton at Dayton, Ohio. In September 2002 he self-published his book Teacups & Sticky Buns.

He currently devotes himself full-time to painting and writing dividing his time between a cottage in the Muskoka Region of Ontario, his family's homestead built in 1824 on Chaleur Bay in northern New Brunswick, and a winter home in Florida with his partner Paul Menard.

References 

1945 births
Living people
Canadian businesspeople
Canadian non-fiction writers
Canadian LGBT writers
Businesspeople in coffee
People from Gloucester County, New Brunswick
Businesspeople from Dayton, Ohio
Culligan
Writers from Dayton, Ohio